Caitlin Dransfield (born 13 January 1991) is an Australian para-badminton player. She competed at the 2020 Summer Paralympics where badminton made its Paralympics debut.

Personal
Dransfield was born on 13 January 1991 with right-sided hemiplegia cerebral palsy. She attended Mount Lawley Senior High School. In 2021, she is employed at Rise and studying a Bachelor of Disability and Community Inclusion at Flinders University.

Badminton
Her early sporting life was predominantly in tennis. In 2016, she took up para badminton and is a member of the Duncraig Badminton Club in Perth, Western Australia. She is classified as SL4. In 2018, she won Women's Singles (SL3-SL4) and Mixed Doubles at the 2018 Oceania Championships.

At the 2020 Summer Paralympics, competing in the Women's singles SL4, Dransfield lost to Helle Sofie Sagoy of Norway 2-0 in the Group Stage. She then lost to Chanida Srinavakul from Thailand 2-0 but then managed to take a set off Olivia Meier of Canada but still lost 2-1. She was therefore eliminated and did not compete in the quarterfinals.

She is coached by Mark Cunningham in Perth.

Achievements

Oceania Championships 
Women's singles

D2ubles

Mixed doubles

References

Notes

External links

Badminton World Federation Profile
 

1991 births
Living people
Australian female badminton players
Paralympic badminton players of Australia
Badminton players at the 2020 Summer Paralympics
Australian para-badminton players